Dunbar is a town on the North Sea coast in East Lothian in the south-east of Scotland, approximately  east of Edinburgh and  from the English border north of Berwick-upon-Tweed.

Dunbar is a former royal burgh, and gave its name to an ecclesiastical and civil parish.

The town is served by Dunbar railway station with links to Edinburgh and the rest of Scotland, as well as London and stations along the north-east England corridor.

Dunbar has a harbour dating from 1574 and is home to the Dunbar Lifeboat Station, the second-oldest RNLI station in Scotland.

Dunbar is the birthplace of the explorer, naturalist, and influential conservationist John Muir. The house in which Muir was born is located on the High Street, and has been converted into a museum. There is also a commemorative statue beside the town clock, and John Muir Country Park is located to the north-west of the town. The eastern section of the John Muir Way coastal path starts from the harbour. One of the two campuses to Dunbar Primary School: John Muir Campus, is named in his honour. A sculpture, The DunBear, the focal point of the DunBear Park mixed-use development, was erected as a tribute to John Muir and his role in the establishment of National Parks in the USA.

History

Etymology
In its present form, the name Dunbar is derived from its Gaelic equivalent, meaning "summit fort". That itself is probably a Gaelicisation of the Cumbric form , with the same meaning. This form seems to be attested as Dynbaer in the seventh-century Vita Sancti Wilfrithi.

Pre-history 
Excavations in advance of a housing development by CFA Archaeology, in 2003, found the remains of a later Bronze Age/early Iron Age (800–540 BC) person, indicating that people were living in the area during that time.

To the north of the present High Street an area of open ground called Castle Park preserves almost exactly the hidden perimeter of an Iron Age promontory fort. The early settlement was a principal centre of the people known to the Romans as Votadini.

Early history
Dunbar was subsumed into Anglian Northumbria as that kingdom expanded in the 6th century and is believed to be synonymous with the Dynbaer of Eddius around 680, the first time that it appears in the written record.

The 2003 archaeological excavation also found a cemetery comprising 32 long-cist burials. Cemeteries of this type date from the early Christian period (AD 4th–8th centuries) and have been found in several areas around Dunbar, including to the east of Spott roundabout and at the Dunbar swimming pool indicated a settlement existed during this time.

The influential Northumbrian monk and scholar St Cuthbert, born around 630, was probably from around Dunbar: while still a boy, and employed as a shepherd, one night he had a vision of the soul of Saint Aidan being carried to heaven by angels and thereupon went to the monastery of Old Melrose and became a monk.

It was then a king's vill and prison to Bishop Wilfrid. As a royal holding of the kings of Northumbria, the economy centred on the collecting of food renders and the administration of the northern (now Scottish) portion of that kingdom. It was the base of a senior royal official, a reeve (later sheriff).

Scottish conquest
Danish and Norse attacks on southern Northumbria caused its power to falter and the northern portion became equally open to annexation by Scotland. Dunbar was burnt by Kenneth MacAlpin in the 9th century. Scottish control was consolidated in the next century and when Lothian was ceded to Malcolm II after the battle of Carham in 1018, Dunbar was finally an acknowledged part of Scotland.

Throughout these turbulent centuries Dunbar's status must have been preserved because it next features as part of a major land grant and settlement by Malcolm III in favour of the exiled earl Gospatric of Northumbria (to whom he may have been full cousin) during 1072. Malcolm needed to fill a power vacuum on his south-eastern flank; Gospatric required a base from which to plot the resumption of his Northumbrian holding. The grant included Dunbar and, it can be deduced, an extensive swath of East Lothian and Berwickshire or Merse (hence March). Gospatric founded the family of Dunbar. The head of the House of Dunbar filled the position of Earls of Dunbar and March until the 15th century.

Later history
The town became successively a baronial burgh and royal burgh (1370).

Major battles were fought nearby in 1296 and 1650. The latter was fought during the Wars of the Three Kingdoms between a Scottish Covenanter army and English Parliamentarians led by Oliver Cromwell. The Scots were routed, leading to the overthrow of the monarchy and the occupation of Scotland.

A permanent military presence was established in the town with the completion of Castle Park Barracks in 1855.

The local band, Dunbar Royal British Legion Pipe Band, which was founded in 1976, has competed with success in national competitions.

On 3 January 1987, a devastating fire destroyed much of the town's historic parish church: though the fire practically destroyed the monument and left only the outer walls remaining, the church has since been rebuilt with a modern interior.

Archaeology
During 2003, archaeological excavations at Oxwell Mains (Lafarge Cement Works) near Dunbar revealed the site of a Mesolithic house believed to be from around the 9th millennium BC. The site suggests a domed building. Although considered extremely rare and a site of national importance this site is in the middle of an area planned for quarrying.

An archaeological excavation undertaken by Headland Archaeology on a site previously occupied by the Captain's Cabin (a local landmark) within the area of Castle Park identified a sequence of archaeological features reflecting around 2,000 years of human activity.

The earliest feature was a large ditch which may have formed part of the defences around a promontory fort previously identified during earlier excavations near the coast at Castle Park. The scale of the ditches indicated an impressive monument. A radiocarbon date of between 50 BC and AD 70 was obtained from charcoal recovered from its infill.

Much later a rectangular building was built over the top of the infilled ditch. Large quantities of burnt grain were recovered indicating that the building was a grain store that had been destroyed by fire. It was established that this was part of the Anglian settlement that had also been identified during earlier excavations.

Between the 9th and 11th centuries the area was used as a cemetery. Archeologists excavated 76 articulated skeletons, and the disarticulated remains of a further 51 individuals were recovered. The articulated skeletons were all buried in the standard Christian fashion. A small number of the skeletons were in long cists, but the majority were simple shroud burials.

A dump or midden above the cemetery contained many elephant ivory off-cuts dating to the 18th or 19th century.

Climate
As with most of the British Isles, Dunbar has an oceanic climate (Köppen: Cfb) with cool summers and mild winters.

Environment

Due to its geographical location, Dunbar receives less rain and more hours of direct sunshine per year than most places in Scotland.

Dunbar has two promenades, forming part of the John Muir Way. These provide an ideal viewpoint to see Dunbar's geological features including volcanic deposits and dykes seen from a high vantage point on the western clifftop promenade which passes the town's Public and Winterfield parks.

There are two local beaches, the smaller East Beach next to the town featuring rock pools and the expansive Belhaven Beach on the outskirts.

Lochend Woods are a community resource owned and managed by the Dunbar Community Woodland Group.

Economy

Dunbar has a vibrant and historic town centre with a large number of independent, locally owned retail businesses. Amongst the gift shops, salons, and cafes there are a community owned bakery and grocer, a butchers and fishmonger, traditional sweet shop, chocolatiere, florists, pet shop, and a hardware store. The town also has a zero waste shop as well as several vintage and antique stores and two charity shops. There are two popular RNLI stores reflecting the town's important maritime connection. The High Street also features a great number of historic closes, two museums, and the "Backlands" garden and is a short walk to the scenic harbour area with its summertime food outlets. On the periphery of the town is a large garden centre with cafe, an Asda store accompanied by a drive-thru McDonald's built in late 2015, a restaurant and hotel owned by Marston's named the Pine Marten.

Local businesses are supported by the Dunbar Trades Association, now in its 75th year.

Dunbar has many hotels, B & Bs, a hostel, and campsites as well as short term lets. Located here are a number of companies offering adventure activities including surfing, wakeboarding, waterparks, coasteering, kite surfing, stand up paddleboarding (SUP) as well as boat and fishing tours which draw tourists to the area. Dunbar has a large indoor pool, many sports facilities, tennis courts, bowling greens, and facilities for petanque and putting.

Tourists are also attracted by the walking and cycling routes in the area with other long-distance routes, the John Muir Way and Coast & Castles routes, also very popular. A number of accommodation providers offer cycle storage.

Agriculture remains important, but although the harbour is still active mainly landing shellfish, fishing has declined. Its main manufacturers are Tarmac, producing cement at its Dunbar cement plant in Oxwell Mains (the only integrated cement plant in Scotland), and Belhaven Brewery, producing Scottish Ale.

Sport

Football

Dunbar is also home to the Dunbar United Colts Football Club, who play their home matches at Hallhill Sports Centre.

Golf
Dunbar Golf Club: Laid out in 1857 and redesigned by Old Tom Morris around 1894, Dunbar East Links is situated on the estuary of the Firth of Forth. It is used as an Open Championship Qualifying Venue when the Open is played at Muirfield and all of the major Scottish Championships have been played here, The Scottish Amateur, Scottish Professional Championships, and Scottish Boys' Championship. The British Ladies and the Ladies Home Internationals have also enjoyed Dunbar as a venue. Dunbar is also home to Winterfield Golf Club.

Rugby
Dunbar is also home to Dunbar RFC. They play their home games at Hallhill Sports Centre and operate a 1st XV, 2nd XV and various school teams. The 1st XV play in the East Region League Division 2.

Basketball
Dunbar Grammar School hosts basketball training for many school and club squads. School teams often participate in the Scottish Cup competition for their appropriate level. The school also hosts training for the club Dunbar Dragons.

Coastal Rowing
Dunbar Coastal Rowing Club has two St Ayles Skiffs - 'Volunteer' and 'Black Agnes'. They are frequently seen rowing off the coast towards Belhaven or Torness or even just fishing. In 2018 they rowed to all of the named islands in the Firth of Forth. In 2019 they are competing in the World Championships at Stranraer.

Wakeboarding 
Foxlake in Dunbar was the first cable wakeboarding centre in Scotland. As well as wakeboarding it also offers a water assault course, ringo rides and segways. There is also a cafe in the centre.

Surfing and paddle boarding 
Surfing is popular on Belhaven Bay. The Coast to Coast surf school is located next to Belhaven Bay. Paddle boarding is also popular on Belhaven Bay.

Education

The town itself is served by two primary schools, West Barns Primary School and Dunbar Primary School, and a non-denominational state secondary school, Dunbar Grammar School. Dunbar Grammar School also serves a wide catchment area which includes the surrounding areas and villages of East Linton, Stenton, and Oldhamstocks. There is also a small number of children who live in Cockburnspath that attend Dunbar Grammar. The school currently has a roll of 1,006 pupils. As of August 2018, Claire Slowther, a former deputy head teacher at the school, is the head teacher, succeeding Paul Raffaelli. Dunbar Primary School is split between two campuses, the original building which is now referred to as "John Muir Campus" taking Primary 1–3s along with nursery pupils, with the newer-built "Lochend Campus" taking Primary 4–7s.

There is also a private school, Belhaven Hill School, a mixed-sex prep school for 7–13-year-olds.

Youth facilities
Many youth groups use the facilities of The Bleachingfield Community Centre.

Religion

Presbytery of Dunbar
The town Dunbar was within the Church of Scotland presbytery of Dunbar.
Coldingham, Parish and Priory (notices of Cockburnspath, etc.), A. Thomson (1908).
The History of Dunbar. James Miller (1859).
An Old Kirk Chronicle. Peter Hately Waddell, D.D. (1893). 
The Churches of St Baldred. Rev. A. I. Ritchie (1880). 
Saint Mary's, Whitekirk. Rev. E. B. Rankin (1914). 
History of Berwickshire Naturalists' Club (for Cockburnspath, Oldhamstocks, etc.)

Today, there are several churches in Dunbar.  These are:

Church of Scotland
 Dunbar Parish Church, Queens Road
 Dunglass Parish Church, Kirk Bridge
 Belhaven Parish Church, Belhaven Road

Episcopal and Methodist Church
 St. Anne's Church, Westgate 
 Methodist Church, Victoria Street

Catholic Church
 Our Lady of the Waves Church, Westgate

On film
Films which have shots of Dunbar include:
Lothian Landscape (1974) 21 min, colour. Narrated by Gordon Jackson 
Dunbar (1958) 3 min, B&W, silent
Dunbar - The A1 Resort (1970) 20 min, colour, sound

Notable buildings

 Chapel tower (with doocot conversion) of the Trinitarian Priory, Friarscroft, west of the town. Founded c. 1240 by Christiana de Brus, Countess of Dunbar.
 Dunbar Castle, possibly from the 14th century, rebuilt and remodelled c.1490 and c.1520. Largely ruined with the aid of gunpowder (deliberately by Act of Parliament) in 1567 and with the whole north end removed with the aid of explosives (detonated using a specially-invented electrical system) for the new Victoria Harbour 1842–44.
 Parish Church (see above) by James Gillespie Graham 1818–21 in local red sandstone from Bourhouse quarry.
 Parish Church Hall (1910), located behind the post office off the High Street, contains stained glass removed from St Giles' Cathedral, Edinburgh, redundant there on the creation of the Thistle Chapel.
 Abbey Free Church (1850) by Thomas Hamilton.
 St Anne's Episcopal Church (1889) by Robert Rowand Anderson.
 Dunbar Methodist Church is the oldest Methodist Church in Scotland, having been erected in 1764. Both John Wesley and Charles Wesley were trustees of the Society in Dunbar and John preached at the Methodist Church on 21 occasions.
 Dunbar Town House, High Street, (c.1550).
 Mercat Cross (c.1911) created from medieval fragments to replace lost original sited opposite West Port. Now beside Town House.
 Lauderdale House (1790–92), designed by Robert Adam and executed by his brother John after Robert's death; built round the carcass of Dunbar House (c.1730).
 Railway station (1845) but altered.
 Cromwell Harbour, very old fishing harbour which dates to 1600s.
 Ordance Survey Tidal Gauge - Beneath the Castle Rock at Victoria Harbour is a small castellated building, now the Harbourmaster's office, but originally built in 1913 by the Ordnance Survey and used as part of a network that was used to establish the 'Mean Sea Level' that is used as the reference benchmark for all heights 'above sea level' in the UK.
 Dunbar Battery (1781) was built to protect the town from privateers in the 18th century and restored in 2017 by Dunbar Harbour Trust with improvements made to access and a new outdoor amphitheatre sensitively inserted within the defensive walls. The Dunbar Battery also features "Sea Cubes", a public artwork by Scottish artist Donald Urquhart. The project won the Architects' Journal Architecture Awards 2017 for the Best Budget Project of the Year and was Commended in the Scottish Civic Trust My Places Awards 2018.

Notable people
 Joan Beaufort, Queen of Scots, wife of King James I of Scotland, who served as the Regent of Scotland in the immediate aftermath of his death and during the minority of her son James II of Scotland, before being engulfed in a power struggle with members of the nobility. In desperation she took refuge in Dunbar Castle where she was subsequently besieged by her opponents, in which place and circumstances she died in the year 1445. 
 Alexander Stewart, Duke of Albany, second son of King James II of Scotland and Mary of Guelders, was Duke of Albany, Earl of March, Lord of Annandale and Isle of Man and the Warden of the Marches, which altogether gave him an impressive power base in the east and west borders, centred on Dunbar Castle which he owned and lived in. He attempted to seize control of Scotland from his brother King James III of Scotland, but was ultimately unsuccessful.
 John Stewart, Duke of Albany, de facto ruler of Scotland and important soldier, diplomat, and politician in a Scottish and continental European context, was the only son of the above Duke of Albany, and managed where his father had failed and became Regent of Scotland, while he also became Count of Auvergne and Lauraguais in France and, lastly, inherited from his father the position of Earl of March, which allowed him to likewise use Dunbar Castle as his centre of power in Scotland.
 Alexander Dow, influential Orientalist, author and British East India Company army officer; resident and educated in Dunbar for part of his boyhood
 William Alexander Bain, pharmacologist
 Dr James Wyllie Gregor FRSE, botanist, born in Dunbar
 Sir Anthony Home, VC KCB, British soldier who was notable as a recipient of the Victoria Cross and the eventual achievement of the rank of Surgeon-General of the British Armed Forces; born and bred in Dunbar from a local family
 John Muir, important conservationist, geologist, environmental philosopher, and pacifist; one of the founders of the United States system of National Parks and Sierra Club, born in Dunbar
 General Sir Reginald Wingate, 1st Baronet, army officer and colonial governor, 'the maker of the Anglo-Egyptian Sudan', Governor-General of the Sudan (1899–1916), British High Commissioner in Egypt (1917–1919), commander of military operations in the Hedjaz (1916–1919), for many years the senior general of the British army, long-time resident in Dunbar
 Robert Wilson, one of the inventors of the ship's propeller, born and bred in Dunbar from a local family
 Black Agnes, Countess of Dunbar and heroine of local folklore
 James Hepburn, 4th Earl of Bothwell, notorious third and last husband of Mary, Queen of Scots, and owner of Dunbar Castle
 Hugh Trevor-Roper, renowned English historian who boarded at Belhaven Hill School
 Walter Runciman, 1st Baron Runciman, major shipowner and maverick Liberal politician, born in Dunbar to parents from Dunbar
 Saint Wilfrid, 7th to early 8th century English bishop and saint; imprisoned for a time in Dunbar
 Saint Cuthbert, early saint and evangelist of the Northumbrian church, Bishop of Lindisfarne, at a time when Northumbria was a leader in promoting and spreading the message of Christianity in a British and wider European context and, he was, according to some authors, born in and initially brought up in Dunbar to a local noble family, before being fostered in the Melrose area with a related or allied family as per the traditions of his class and time.
 Maria Lyle, para-sprinter, won medals at both the Commonwealth and Paralympic Games
 Jack Hobens, Scottish-American professional golfer
 Sadie Aitken, Scottish actor, theatre manager, film critic for BBC
 Davy Henderson, Scottish musician (The Fire Engines, The Nectarine No. 9)

Twin towns
Dunbar is twinned with 
 Lignières, France.
 Martinez, California, United States.

Gallery

See also

 John Muir's Birthplace
 John Muir Way
 List of places in East Lothian

References

Sources

External links

Dunbar's main website
 Activities in Dunbar.
Dunbar & District Historical Society
Aspects of tourism in Dunbar since the 1950s
Danny MacAskill x adidas Outdoor : Welcome to the Family

 
Towns in East Lothian
Ports and harbours of Scotland
Royal burghs
Seaside resorts in Scotland
Port cities and towns of the North Sea
Populated coastal places in Scotland